Kasey Studdard (born July 1, 1984) is a former American football offensive guard who played in the National Football League (NFL). The son of former Denver Broncos tackle Dave Studdard, he was drafted by the Texans in the sixth round (183rd overall) of the 2007 NFL Draft. He played college football at Texas.

High school years

Studdard attended Highlands Ranch High School in Highlands Ranch, Colorado, where he won four varsity letters in football, basketball, and track and field. In football, he was a four-year starter as an offensive and defensive lineman. He was a two-time All-District selection, a two-time All-County selection, and a two-time first-team All-State selection.

As a sophomore, he was an All-League selection, and posted 75 tackles, four sacks, two fumble recoveries, and two blocked kicks. Studdard graduated from Highlands Ranch High School in 2002. Capping his high school career, he played in the 2002 U.S. Army All-American Bowl alongside future fellow Texas Longhorns Justin Blalock and Rodrique Wright.

College career
Studdard redshirted his freshman year at Texas and saw limited action. As a redshirt sophomore, Studdard was the starter for a Longhorn team that was second in the nation in rushing and went on to win its first Bowl Championship Series game, against Michigan at the 2005 Rose Bowl. The following year, Studdard helped anchor the offensive line, the same year that Texas led the nation in scoring offense. The Longhorns once again had the second-best rushing attack in the nation and went on to win the national championship against USC at the Rose Bowl.  Studdard garnered second-team All Big 12 honors for his performance. In his final year at Texas, he started all 13 games and was voted team captain by his teammates. The team went 10-3, with a win against Iowa in the 2006 Alamo Bowl, the third straight bowl win for Texas. After the season ended, Studdard was named to the first-team All Big 12 by the league coaches and media.

Professional career
Studdard was drafted by the Houston Texans in the sixth round of the 2007 NFL Draft (183rd overall).  He signed a four-year contract with the team on July 20, 2007. In 2009, Studdard replaced the injured Chester Pitts, and went on to start all 14 remaining games. He was re-signed by the team on July 28, 2012.

Personal life
Studdard is the son of Dave Studdard, who was an offensive tackle at Texas and played his entire NFL career with the Denver Broncos. He graduated with a degree in youth and community studies. Studdard considers Katy, Texas, a suburb of Houston, his home town.

Kasey also hosts a hunting and fishing TV show airing on Sportsman's Channel called Big Ugly Outdoors, for more info on the show, go to biguglyoutdoors.com

References

External links
Houston Texans bio
Texas Longhorns bio
Tennessee Titans bio

1984 births
Living people
Players of American football from Denver
Players of American football from Houston
American football offensive guards
Texas Longhorns football players
Houston Texans players
Tennessee Titans players